Sir Edward Phillip Solomon  (1845 – 20 November 1914) was a successful lawyer and politician of the Transvaal Colony and the Union of South Africa.

Early life
Edward Solomon was born in 1845, studied to be an attorney, and based himself in Johannesburg. He was involved in politics from early on, strongly identifying with the cause of the "Uitlanders" (English resident in the Boer republics). He even became a prominent member of the Reform Committee which sponsored the Jameson Raid in 1895, which led to his brief imprisonment in Pretoria.

Solomon was a member of a large and influential Cape family, of St Helenan Jewish descent. Members of the Solomon family were heavily involved in Southern African politics: Cape Colony politician Saul Solomon was his uncle, and his brothers were the Attorney General Sir Richard Solomon and future Chief Justice Sir William Henry Solomon.

Political career
He became the first Chairman of the Transvaal Colony Responsible Government Association, and in 1906 was elected as the President of the Transvaal National Association, a political party based on South African Union, equity of the races, and opposing Chinese mine labourers.

With Transvaal having been granted responsible self-government by letters patent on 6 December 1906, in early 1907 Solomon was elected to the Transvaal Legislative Assembly at its first election on 20 February 1907 for the seat of Fordsburg. With his brother Richard successfully negotiating with the Het Volk Party led by Louis Botha and Jan Smuts, to have a coalition cabinet despite the Het Volk majority in the Legislative Assembly, Solomon was subsequently appointed to the first Transvaal Cabinet by Prime Minister Louis Botha as Minister of Public Works.

Following the creation of the Union of South Africa, on 15 November 1910 Solomon was elected to the Senate of South Africa. Having been granted the use of the title "The Honourable" for life, in the 1911 New Year Honours, Solomon was made a Knight Commander of the Order of St Michael and St George (KCMG). Solomon died age 69 at his residence in Parktown, Johannesburg on 20 November 1914.

References

1845 births
1914 deaths
19th-century South African lawyers
South African politicians
White South African people
Transvaal Colony people
People from Johannesburg
South African Jews
South African people of Saint Helenian descent
Knights Commander of the Order of St Michael and St George
South African knights
Members of the Senate of South Africa